In May 2022, the gang rape  of a 17-year-old girl in Road no. 44, Jubilee Hills,  Hyderabad, sparked outrage across Telangana and India.  The minor girl returning home after attending a get-together at Amnesia pub was gang-raped by six persons, including five minors in Jubilee Hills area of the State capital. All the accused were arrested by police from their separate hideouts.

Incident
It was on March 28, 2022 that the victim was gang raped near Sri Peddamma Thalli Temple in Road no. 44, Jubilee Hills. They even had condoms on them and used protection while committing the gang rape. The Toyota Innova Crysta in which the gang rape took place had clear windows. However, the accused used temporary screens for covering them up on the day of the offence.

Investigation
Banjara Hills ACP M Sudarshan was the investigating officer in the gang-rape case. Saaduddin Malik and Umair Khan  were arrested in the beginning. The same month, police carried out potency test on the only major and three minors at Forensic Science department of Osmania General Hospital. The minor victim identified the six accused in the gang rape case during Test Identification Parade (TIP).

The minors include one who has been charged with gang rape and one who is facing molestation charges.  Another minor is the son of a Telangana Rashtra Samithi (TRS) leader from Sangareddy. Khadhar Khan, Son of TRS leader and Telangana State Wakf Board Mohammed Chairman Masiullah Khan,  was arrested by Hyderabad police in minor gang rape. Raheel Khan is the son of Bahadurpura AIMIM MLA Mohammad Moazam Khan.

In July 2022, Jubilee Hills police  filed the chargesheet against the six accused in the minor gangrape case at the Nampally Sessions court as well as the Juvenile Justice Board. The 600-page chargesheet has detailed statements from 65 witnesses with DNA reports, CCTV footage, phone and voice messages. Jubilee Hills police decided to seek trial of all the minors accused in the gangrape case as adults to ensure that they receive maximum punishment.

Aftermath
In the last week of July 2022, the five minors were granted bail.  Juvenile Justice Board  allowed the four other minors accused to be released on bail after serving 50 days. As per reports in August 2022, one of the juveniles (AIMIM MLA's son) in the Jubilee hills minor’s gang-rape is reportedly being sent abroad. 

Saduddin Malik was granted bail in August 2022 after 61 days in jail. Malik was in Chanchalguda Central Jail in judicial remand.

Trial
On 30 September 2022, Juvenile Justice Board ordered four of the minors to be tried as adults. The fifth minor will face trial as a juvenile. The accused were assessed by a Professor of Psychiatry from the Institute of Mental Health (Erragadda).

In October 2022, AIMIM MLA’s son filed a discharge petition in the Special court for POSCO cases, claiming innocence. In December 2022, MLA’s son denied charges while appearing in front of Juvenile justice Board.  He expressed the desire to be tried. The case has now been posted for hearing on February 6, 2023.

Public protests and Reactions
In June 2022, BJP MLA Raghunandan Rao released a video and photograph alleging that All India Majlis-e-Ittehadul Muslimeen (AIMIM) MLA's son in Mercedes Benz car with the victim.  BJP MP Arvind Dharmapuri questioned the "silence" of Chief Minister K. Chandrashekar Rao and Minister  K. T. Rama Rao on the rise in crime against women in Telangana, asking if "they are promoting rapes". Minister K. T. Rama Rao tweeted that he was shocked to see the news of the rape incident in Hyderabad. In August 2022, K. T. Rama Rao said that loopholes in Juvenile Justice Act, Indian Penal Code and CrPC have resulted in rapists getting bail in the case. Telangana BJP chief Bandi Sanjay Kumar wrote to CM K. Chandrashekar Rao demanding to hand over the case to CBI. In June 2022, Chairman of Telangana State Wakf Board Mohammed Masiullah Khan was asked by the TRS to resign. Congress Party demand the state government to set up a fast-track court investigation and trial.

Actor Sonu Sood said that he was shocked when he heard about the gang rape incident, called it ‘most unfortunate’, and said that he hoped it had never happened. Jubilee Hills police arrested a journalist Subhan from old city here for circulating photos and videos of accused involved in gang rape.  He uploaded them on internet in the name of RS Media and they went viral.

See also 
POCSO Act
Rape in India
2012 Delhi gang rape and murder
2019 Hyderabad gang rape and murder

References 

Crime in Telangana
Gang rape in India
Incidents of violence against women
Rape in the 2020s
Violence against women in India
Rape in India